Ur Kasdim ( ʾūr Kaśdīm), commonly translated as Ur of the Chaldeans, is a city mentioned in the Hebrew Bible as the birthplace of the Israelite and Ishmaelite patriarch Abraham. In 1862, Henry Rawlinson identified Ur Kaśdim with Tell el-Muqayyar, near Nasiriyah in southern Iraq. In 1927, Leonard Woolley excavated the site and identified it as a Sumerian archaeological site where the Chaldeans were to settle around the 9th century BC. Recent archaeology work has continued to focus on the location in Nasiriyah, where the ancient Ziggurat of Ur is located.

Other sites traditionally thought to be Abraham's birthplace are in the vicinity of the city of Edessa (Şanlıurfa in modern south eastern Turkey). Traditional Jewish and Muslim authorities, such as Maimonides and Josephus, placed Ur Kaśdim at various Upper Mesopotamian or at other southeast Anatolian sites  such as Urkesh, Urartu, Urfa, or Kutha.

In tradition

Bible
Ur Kaśdim is mentioned four times in the Hebrew Bible, in the Book of Genesis, and the Book of Nehemiah.

The distinction "Kaśdim" is usually rendered in English as "of the Chaldees." In Genesis, the name is found in 11:28, 11:31 and 15:7. Although not explicitly stated in the Tanakh, it is generally understood to be the birthplace of Abraham. Genesis 11:27–28 names it as the death place of Abraham's brother Haran, and the point of departure of Terah's household, including his son Abraham.
	
In Genesis 12:1, after Abraham and his father Terah have left Ur Kaśdim for the city of Haran (probably Harran), God instructs Abraham to leave his native land (Hebrew moledet). The traditional Jewish understanding of the word moledet is "birthplace" (e.g. in the Judaica Press translation). Similarly, in Genesis 24:4–10, Abraham instructs his servant to bring a wife for Isaac from his moledet, and the servant departs for Haran.

Septuagint
The Septuagint translation of Genesis does not include the term "Ur"; instead it describes the "Land of the Chaldees" (Greek χώρα Χαλδαίων, Chora Chaldaion). Some scholars have held that biblical Ur was not a city at all, but simply a word for land.

Jubilees
The Book of Jubilees states that Ur was founded in 1688 Anno Mundi (year of the world) by 'Ur son of Kesed, presumably the offspring of Arphaxad, adding that in this same year wars began on Earth.
And 'Ur, the son of Kesed, built the city of 'Ara of the Chaldees, and called its name after his own name and the name of his father. (Jubilees 11:3).

New Testament
In the New Testament, it is described indirectly at Acts 7, as the "land of the Chaldeans". Saint Stephen located it in Mesopotamia.

Islamic
According to Islamic texts, Abraham (Ibrahim in Arabic) was thrown into the fire. In the story, the temperature of the king's fire was reduced by God, saving the life of Ibrahim. While the Quran does not mention the king's name, Muslim commentators have assigned Nimrod as the king based on hadiths.

Location

Lower Mesopotamia
Eusebius in his Preparation for the Gospel preserves a fragment of the work Concerning the Jews by the 1st century BC historian Alexander Polyhistor, which in turn quotes a passage in Concerning the Jews of Assyria by the 2nd century BC historian Eupolemus. The passage claimed that Abraham was born in the Babylonian city Camarina, which it notes was also called "Uria". (Such indirect quotations of Eupolemus via Polyhistor are referred to as Pseudo-Eupolemus.) This site is identified by modern scholars with the Sumerian city of Ur located at Tell el-Mukayyar, which in ancient texts was named Uriwa or Urima.

Woolley's identification of Ur
In 1927 Leonard Woolley identified Ur Kaśdim with the Sumerian city of Ur (founded  3800 BC), in southern Mesopotamia, where the Chaldeans settled much later (around the 9th century BC); Ur lay on the boundary of the region later called Kaldu (Chaldea, corresponding to Hebrew Kaśdim) in the first millennium BCE. It was the sacred city of the moon god and the name "Camarina" is thought to be related to the much later appearing Arabic word for "moon": qamar. The identification of Sumerian Ur with Ur Kaśdim accords with the view that Abraham's ancestors may have been moon-worshippers, an idea based on the possibility that the name of Abraham's father Terah is related to the Hebrew root for moon (y-r-h).

Woolley's identification became the mainstream scholarly opinion on the location of Biblical Ur Kasdim, despite the earlier traditions that Ur Kasdim should lie in Northern Mesopotamia. Woolley's identification was challenged with the discovery of the city of Harran in northern Mesopotamia, near the present-day village of Altınbaşak in modern Turkey (archaeological excavations at Harran began in the 1950s).

Recent archaeological work focuses on the area of Nasiriyah (in southern Iraq), where the remains of the ancient Ziggurat of Ur stand.

Identification with Uruk
According to T.G. Pinches and A.T. Clay, some Talmudic and medieval Arabic writers identified Ur of the Chaldees with the Sumerian city of  Uruk, called Erech in the Bible and Warka in Arabic. Both scholars reject the equation. Talmud Yoma 10a identifies Erech with a place called "Urichus", and no tradition exists equating Ur Kaśdim with Urichus or Erech/Uruk.

Upper Mesopotamia
Jewish scholarship identifies Abraham's birthplace as somewhere in Upper Mesopotamia. This view was particularly noted by Nachmanides (Ramban). Nevertheless, this interpretation of moledet as meaning "birthplace" is not universal. Many Pentateuchal translations, from the Septuagint to some modern English versions, render moledet as "kindred" or "family".

Writing in the 4th century AD, Ammianus Marcellinus in his Rerum Gestarum Libri (chapter VIII) mentions a castle named Ur which lay between Hatra and Nisibis. A. T. Clay understood this as an identification of Ur Kaśdim, although Marcellinus makes no explicit claim in this regard. In her Travels (chapter XX), Egeria, recording travels dated to the early 380s AD, mentions Hur lying five stations from Nisibis on the way to Persia, apparently the same location, and she does identify it with Ur Kaśdim. However, the castle in question was only founded during the time of the second Persian Empire (224–651).

Tradition of Sanliurfa
Another possible location for Ur of the Chaldees (Ur Kasdim) is the ancient Assyrian and Seleucid city Edessa, now called Şanlıurfa. According to some Jewish traditions, this is the site where Abraham was cast into a furnace by Nimrod as punishment for his monotheistic beliefs, but miraculously escaped unscathed.

The Turkish name for the city, Urfa, is derived from the earlier Syriac ܐܘܪܗܝ (Orhāy) and Greek  (Orrha), the city being a major centre of Assyrian-Syriac Christianity.

Islamic tradition holds that the site of Abraham's birth is a cave situated near the center of Şanlıurfa. The Halil-Ur Rahman Mosque lies in the vicinity of the cave.

Rendsburg points out that this location makes better sense of the Biblical references, especially that if Teraḥ and family left Ur-Kasdim to travel to Canaan, but stopped en route in Ḥarran, then the location of Ur-Kasdim should be to the north of Ḥarran. In addition, Abraham's grandfather Nahor and great-grandfather Serug share names with cities located near Ḥarran in northern Mesopotamia ("Til-Nahiri" and Suruç), suggesting that Abraham's clan was well established in this area in the period before the migration from Ur-Kasdim.

Urkesh
According to A.S. Issar, Ur Kasdim is identified with the site of Urkesh – the capital of the Hurrian Kingdom, now in northeastern Syria. It is further hypothesized that the Biblical travel of Abraham's kin from Urkesh to Harran in order to reach Canaan is much more reasonable than a travel from the Sumerian city of Ur.

References

External links
Biblical Archaeology Review May/June 2001: Where Was Abraham's Ur?  by Allan R. Millard
Prophet Abraham and Sanliurfa  Islamic traditions connecting Abraham's early life and Sanli Urfa.
Cyrus H. Gordon, Abraham and the Merchants of Ura, Journal of Near Eastern Studies 17 (1958), pp. 28–31.
COJS: Royal Tombs of Ur, 2600-2500 BCE 
Woolley’s Ur Revisited, Richard L. Zettler, BAR 10:05, Sep/Oct 1984.
Ur of Chaldees by Sir Leonard Woolley

 
Book of Genesis
Book of Nehemiah
Acts of the Apostles
Hebrew Bible cities
Noach (parashah)
Lech-Lecha
Ur
Book of Jubilees